Rareș Bogdan  (born 17 September 1974 in Ocna Mureș, Alba County, Romania) is a Romanian politician who has been a PNL member of the European Parliament for Romania since 2019. He was the leader of the National Liberal Party's electoral list for the 2019 elections. He sits with the European People's Party group (EPP for short).

References 

1974 births
Living people
People from Ocna Mureș
Babeș-Bolyai University alumni
Romanian journalists
National Liberal Party (Romania) MEPs
MEPs for Romania 2019–2024